Marie Louise Shedlock (1854–1935) was an early and influential practitioner of the art of storytelling. She recorded her advice on oral performance in her book The Art of the Story-Teller.

Biography
Shedlock was born in Boulogne, France of English parents; her father was an engineer helping to build a railroad. Although she lived in England for a short time as a child, she returned to France, and ultimately went to Germany to complete her education.

Shedlock's first job was as a schoolteacher. She taught school in England from age 21. At age 36 she began her career as a storyteller, having a debut performance in London. At age 46 she ceased teaching and began her career as a professional storyteller. She had two extended and well-received tours in the United States.

Shedlock's first U. S. tour took place around 1900 and lasted seven years. Mary Wright Plummer, director of the Pratt Institute Library attended one of her public recitals and invited her to perform. Anne Carroll Moore head of the children's library at Pratt invited Shedlock to return to Pratt and tell stories to children. Her first American tour lasted seven years.  After this first tour, Shedlock returned to London, later writing her two books. Shedlock's second U. S. tour began in 1915 and ran for five years.

Shedlock died in January 1935.

Influence on others
Anna Cogswell Tyler a student at Pratt heard Shedlock perform and decided to become a professional storyteller herself. Tyler eventually became head of storytelling for the New York Public Library. Ruth Sawyer heard Shedlock reading the tales of Hans Christian Andersen at Columbia University. Sawyer "vowed that day to become a storyteller."

Works 

 (1920)

References

External links 

 
 
 

1854 births
1935 deaths
British non-fiction writers
British women writers